Prasad is a 2012 Indian Kannada-language drama film directed by Manoj Sati and produced by Ashok Kheny. The film stars Arjun Sarja and Madhuri Bhattacharya. The film's music was scored by Ilaiyaraaja. The dance choreographer for the movie was Shiamak Davar.

The film released across the Karnataka cinema halls on the auspicious Ugadi festival day on 23 March 2012. The film was screened at the Berlin Film Festival, along with fellow Indian film Don 2.

Plot
Shankar (Arjun) is a mechanic who leads a happy life with his wife Malathi (Madhuri Bhattacharya) and his sister's daughters. Malathi gives birth to a boy named Prasad who is deaf and dumb. Shankar doesn't love his son because he is physically disabled. Malathi finds out that Prasad is talented as a swimmer. Initially, Shankar refuses to come to see the swimming competition but later changes his mind. Shankar understands his son's talent and starts caring for him.

Malathi joins as a deaf and dumb teacher in the school where Prasad studies and Shankar opens a mechanic garage. When Prasad tries to help a blind man cross a road, Prasad gets involved in an accident. In the end, Prasad survives and Shankar starts a foundation in the name of Prasad for the deaf and dumb children.

Cast
 Arjun Sarja as Shankar
 Madhuri Bhattacharya as Malathi
 Sankalp as Prasad
 Ramakrishna
 Ramesh Bhat
 Ninasam Ashwath
 Shama
 Monika
 Swathi
 Anjanappa
 Shiamak Davar in a cameo appearance
 Smriti Kulkarni as Nidhi
 Varnika as Shree

Soundtrack

The soundtrack of Prasad consists of 5 songs composed by Ilaiyaraaja and one song composed by Mano Murthy. Kaviraj, Jayanth Kaikini and  V. Nagendra Prasad are the lyricists who have penned the lyrics for the songs.

Reception

Critical response 

Srikanth Srinivasa from Rediff.com scored the film at 3 out of 5 stars and says "Ilayaraja's music is haunting, especially the background score. Mano Murthy has also composed music for a song that shows these special children actually dancing to Shiamak Davar's steps. Parents who are unhappy about having a special child should watch this movie to find out how wrong they are. Director Manoj Sati and his co-director Jagadish Reddy have gone about their job of conveying the message excellently". S. Viswanath from Deccan Herald wrote "What covets you most is melodious music of inimitable maestro Illayaraja. Prasad can be partaken for its meaning and message oriented attempt, even if it’s rather bitter, sweet-sour proffering does may not suit your discerning and demanding palate". A critic from The New Indian Express wrote "Shiamak Davar’s choreography for the songs, especially 'We are Ok' is especially commendable. Rama Krishna too has done complete justice to the supporting role in the film as the protagonists’ well-wisher and friend. Overall, the film is worth watching". A critic from Bangalore Mirror wrote  "Arjun has done an average job in a role which his fans may never have expected him to see.  Madhuri is watchable because of Sudharani’s voice. The emotion in the film is brought forth by the songs and background score of Ilayaraja. Without his captivating  music, the film would have not been half as effective as it is".

Awards
2011 Karnataka State Film Awards
Karnataka State Film Award for First Best Film - Ashok Kheny, Manoj K. Sathi
Best Director - Manoj K. Sathi
Best Actor - Arjun Sarja
Best Child Actor (Male) - Master Sankalp

References

2012 films
2010s Kannada-language films
Films scored by Ilaiyaraaja
Indian drama films
Films about disability in India
2012 directorial debut films